ISO 27001 Lead Implementer is a professional certification for professionals specializing in information security management systems (ISMS) based on the ISO/IEC 27001 standard. This professional certification is intended for information security professionals wanting to understand the steps required to implement the ISO/IEC 27001 standard (as opposed to the ISO/IEC 27001 Lead Auditor certification which is intended for an auditor wanting to audit and certify a system to the ISO/IEC 27001 standard).

This certification is provided by numerous organizations. Some are currently not certified by any personnel certification body while others are certified by accredited certification bodies. Certified ISO/IEC 27001 implementation courses should be accredited to the ISO/IEC 17024 standard.

Other information security certifications
 Certified Information Systems Security Professional
 Certified Information Security Manager
 Certified Information Security Professional from GAQM

External links
 International Accreditation Forum

Information technology qualifications
27001